Aemona is a genus of nymphalid butterflies from Southeast Asia, they are large yellow-brown butterflies resembling dead leaves. The wing apex is acute.

Species
Aemona amathusia (Hewitson, 1867)
Aemona lena Atkinson, 1872
Aemona peali Wood-Mason, 1880

References

Amathusiini
Nymphalidae genera
Taxa named by William Chapman Hewitson